Ballads for Night People is a 1959 album by jazz vocalist June Christy.

Track listing
 "Bewitched, Bothered and Bewildered" (Richard Rodgers, Lorenz Hart) – 4:56
 "Night People" (Tommy Wolf, Fran Landesman) – 3:20
 "Do Nothing till You Hear from Me" (Duke Ellington, Bob Russell) – 4:06
 "I Had A Little Sorrow" (Bob Cooper, Edna St. Vincent Millay) – 3:50
 "I'm In Love" (Norman Kaye, Richard Ferraris) – 2:45
 "Shadow Woman" (Arthur Hamilton) – 3:13
 "Kissing Bug" (Rex Stewart, Billy Strayhorn, Joya Sherrill) – 2:41
 "My Ship" (Kurt Weill, Ira Gershwin) – 3:58
 "Don't Get Around Much Anymore" (Duke Ellington, Bob Russell) – 2:58
 "Make Love to Me" (Paul Mann, Stephan Weiss, Kim Gannon) – 3:08

Personnel
 June Christy – vocals
 Bob Cooper – arranger, conductor, tenor saxophone
 Frank Rosolino – trombone
 Bud Shank – alto saxophone, flute
 Buddy Collette – clarinet
 Chuck Gentry – bass clarinet, contrabass clarinet
 Joe Castro – piano
 Red Callender – bass
 Mel Lewis – drums
 Stan Levey – drums
 Kathryn Julye – harp
 Jim Decker – French horn
 Norman Benno – English horn, bassoon

Recorded Los Angeles, 27 August and 10 September 1959.

1959 albums
June Christy albums
Capitol Records albums
Albums conducted by Bob Cooper (musician)
Albums arranged by Bob Cooper (musician)